= Chełmer Sztyme =

Yiddish-language newspaper published in Poland

- Founder: Nakhum Goldberg
- Founded: 1924
- Ceased publication: 1939
- Political alignment: Non-partisan
- Language: Yiddish language
- Headquarters: Chełm
- OCLC number: 234603783

Chełmer Sztyme (Yiddish: כעלעמער שטימע, translit. khelemer shṭime, 'Voice of Chełm') was a Yiddish language newspaper published from the Polish city of Chełm between 1924 and 1939. It was the leading Yiddish publication in the city at the time. It was founded as Unser Sztyme, but changed name to Chełmer Sztyme in 1927. Initially a weekly, it became a daily newspaper in 1936. It identified itself as a 'non-party' newspaper.

Nakhum Goldberg was the founding editor of the newspaper. Later the editing was taken over by Gershon Lustiker and Fishl Lazar. Fishl Lazar was the publisher of Chełmer Sztyme for many years.

In total 789 issues of Chełmer Sztyme were published.
